The following outline is provided as an overview of and topical guide to Albert Einstein:

Albert Einstein – deceased German-born theoretical physicist. He developed the theory of relativity, one of the two pillars of modern physics (alongside quantum mechanics). Einstein's work is also known for its influence on the philosophy of science. Einstein is best known by the general public for his mass–energy equivalence formula  (which has been dubbed "the world's most famous equation"). He received the 1921 Nobel Prize in Physics "for his services to theoretical physics, and especially for his discovery of the law of  the photoelectric effect", a pivotal step in the evolution of quantum theory. Einstein published more than 300 scientific papers along with over 150 non-scientific works. Einstein's intellectual achievements and originality have made the word "Einstein" synonymous with "genius".

Achievements and contributions

Physics 
 General relativity
 Mass–energy equivalence (E=MC2) 
 Brownian motion
 Fotoelectric effect

Personal life 

 Albert Einstein's political views 
 Religious views of Albert Einstein

Family 

Einstein family
 Pauline Koch (mother)
 Hermann Einstein (father)
 Maja Einstein (sister)
 Mileva Marić (first wife)
 Elsa Einstein (second wife)
 Lieserl Einstein (daughter)
 Hans Albert Einstein (son)
 Eduard Einstein (son)
 Bernhard Caesar Einstein (grandson)
 Evelyn Einstein (granddaughter)
 Thomas Martin Einstein (great-grandson)

Legacy 

 Albert Einstein House
 Einstein's Blackboard
 Einstein refrigerator
 Albert Einstein's brain
 Albert Einstein in popular culture
 Einsteinium
 Awards and honors
 List of things named after Albert Einstein
 Einstein Papers Project
 The Einstein Theory of Relativity (1923 documentary)

Works of Albert Einstein 

 Albert Einstein Archives

Bibliography of works by Einstein 

Scientific publications by Albert Einstein
 Annus Mirabilis papers (1905) 
 "Investigations on the Theory of Brownian Movement" (1905)
 Relativity: The Special and the General Theory (1916)
 The World as I See It (1934)
 "Why Socialism?" (1949)
 Russell–Einstein Manifesto (1955)

Einstein prizes 

 Albert Einstein Award 
 Albert Einstein Medal 
 Albert Einstein Peace Prize 
 Albert Einstein World Award of Science 
 Einstein Prize (APS) 
 Einstein Prize for Laser Science

Organizations concerning Albert Einstein 

 Albert Einstein Society

Publications about Albert Einstein 

 Albert Einstein: Creator and Rebel
 Albert Einstein: The Practical Bohemian
 I Am Albert Einstein

Films about Albert Einstein 

 Einstein (2008)

See also 

 Outline of physics

References

External links 

 
 
 
 Einstein's Personal Correspondence: Religion, Politics, The Holocaust, and Philosophy Shapell Manuscript Foundation
 Federal Bureau of Investigation file on Albert Einstein
 Einstein and his love of music, Physics World
 Albert Einstein on NobelPrize.org
 Albert Einstein, videos on History.com
  – free study course that explores the changing roles of physics and physicists during the 20th century
 Albert Einstein Archives Online (80,000+ Documents) (MSNBC, 19 March 2012)
 Einstein's declaration of intention for American citizenship on the World Digital Library
 Albert Einstein Collection at Brandeis University
 The Collected Papers of Albert Einstein "Digital Einstein" at Princeton University

 
Einstein, Albert
Einstein, Albert